The 2020–21 Stony Brook Seawolves men's basketball team represented Stony Brook University in the 2020–21 NCAA Division I men's basketball season. They played their home games at the Island Federal Credit Union Arena in Stony Brook, New York and were led by second-year head coach Geno Ford. They were members of the America East Conference. They finished  the season 9-14, 7-9 in America East Play to finish in 7th place. In the America East tournament, they lost in the first round to UMass Lowell.

Previous season
The Seawolves finished the 2019–20 season 20–13, 10–6 in America East play to finish in second place. They defeated Albany in the quarterfinals of the America East tournament before losing in the semifinals to Hartford.

Offseason

Departures

Incoming transfers

Roster

Schedule and results

|-
!colspan=12 style=| Non-conference regular season

|-
!colspan=12 style=| America East Conference regular season

|-
!colspan=12 style=| America East tournament
|-

Source

See also 
2019–20 Stony Brook Seawolves women's basketball team

References

Stony Brook Seawolves men's basketball seasons
Stony Brook Seawolves
Stony Brook Seawolves men's basketball
Stony Brook Seawolves men's basketball